Oscar Cásares (born May 7, 1964) is an American  writer and associate professor of creative writing. He is the author of Brownsville: Stories, Amigoland, and Where We Come From. Cásares teaches at the University of Texas at Austin where he is director of the Creative Writing Program.

Honors
Guggenheim Fellowship (2020)
National Endowment for the Arts Fellowship (2006)
James A. Michener Award, Copernicus Society of America, Iowa Writers' Workshop (2002)
Dobie Paisano Fellowship, Texas Institute of Letters, University of Texas (2002)

Bibliography

Books
Where We Come From  (May 21, 2019) 
Amigoland  (August 10, 2009) 
Brownsville: Stories  (March 6, 2003)

Selected Essays 
"Imaginary Friends," Texas Monthly, December 2010 
"The Departed," Texas Monthly, April 2010
"You Must Read This: The Burning Plain," National Public Radio, October 2009
"Grass Roots," Texas Monthly, December 2008
"Ready for Some Futbol?", Texas Monthly, November 2006
"In the Year 1974", Texas Monthly, March 2005 
"Crossing the Border Without Losing Your Past," New York Times, September 2003

References 

1964 births
Living people
University of Texas at Austin faculty
People from Brownsville, Texas
American writers of Mexican descent